Wolfram Setz (born 7 July 1941) is a German historian, editor, translator and essayist.

Life 
Born in Stralsund, Setz studied at the universities of University of Cologne and University of Tübingen, completing his Ph.D. in 1975 with a dissertation on Lorenzo Valla's exposure of the Donation of Constantine as a hoax. Setz was subsequently employed as an editor at Monumenta Germaniae Historica in Munich. Following retirement in 2004, he relocated to Hamburg.

Setz is editor of the "Bibliothek rosa Winkel", a series of over 70 volumes of gay literary reprints, cultural studies, and historical works that was launched in 1991, published initially by Verlag rosa Winkel and since 2001 by Männerschwarm Verlag. Several of Setz's publications have contributed to the rediscovery of the LGBT rights pioneer Karl Heinrich Ulrichs (1825–1895).

Setz was editor of the book series "Homosexualität und Literatur" published by Verlag rosa Winkel (12 volumes, 1981-1999) and a coeditor of the scholarly journal Forum Homosexualität und Literatur (1987-2007). In 1986 he was a founding member of the German LGBT organization Bundesverband Homosexualität and served for several years as a board member until the organization was dissolved in 1997.

German publications (selected) 

 Lorenzo Vallas Schrift gegen die Konstantinische Schenkung. Zur Interpretation und Wirkungsgeschichte. Tübingen: Niemeyer, 1975.
 Ed. Erich Bethe: Die dorische Knabenliebe. Ihre Ethik und ihre Idee. Berlin: Rosa Winkel, 1983.
 Ed. Paul Verlaine: Männer. Hombres. Nachdruck der Ausgabe von 1920. Berlin: Rosa Winkel, 1986.
 Ed. Das Hohelied der Knabenliebe. Erotische Gedichte aus der Griechischen Anthologie. Berlin: Rosa Winkel, 1987.
 Ed. Der Roman eines Konträrsexuellen. Eine Autobiographie. Berlin: Rosa Winkel, 1991.
 Ed. Die Sünde von Sodom. Erinnerungen eines viktorianischen Strichers. Berlin: Rosa Winkel, 1995; Hamburg: MännerschwarmSkript, 2005.
 Ed. Thijs Maasen: Pädagogischer Eros. Gustav Wyneken und die Freie Schulgemeinde Wickersdorf. Berlin: Rosa Winkel, 1995.
 Ed. Xavier Mayne (Edward Irenaeus Prime-Stevenson): Imre. Eine psychologische Romanze. Berlin: Rosa Winkel, 1997.
 Ed. Karl Heinrich Ulrichs: Matrosengeschichten und Gedichte. Ein Lesebuch. Berlin: Rosa Winkel, 1998.
 Transl. Hubert Kennedy: Der Kreis. Eine Zeitschrift und ihr Programm. Berlin: Rosa Winkel, 1999.
 Ed. Karl Heinrich Ulrichs zu Ehren. Materialien zu Leben und Werk. Berlin: Rosa Winkel, 2000.
 Ed. Die Geschichte der Homosexualitäten und die schwule Identität an der Jahrtausendwende. Eine Vortragsreihe aus Anlaß des 175. Geburtstags von Karl Heinrich Ulrichs. Berlin: Rosa Winkel, 2000.
 Karl Heinrich Ulrichs zum 175. Geburtstag. Ein (Ge)Denkblatt. Munich: Forum Homosexualität und Geschichte, 2000.
 Ed. and afterword. Robert Sherard: Oscar Wilde. Die Geschichte einer unglücklichen Freundschaft. Berlin: Rosa Winkel, 2000.
 Coed., with Günter Grau. Schwulsein 2000. Perspektiven im vereinigten Deutschland. Edition Waldschlösschen. Hamburg: MännerschwarmSkript, 2001.
 Ed. Antonio Rocco: Der Schüler Alkibiades. Ein philosophisch-erotischer Dialog. Hamburg: MännerschwarmSkript, 2002.
 Ed. Neue Funde und Studien zu Karl Heinrich Ulrichs. Hamburg: MännerschwarmSkript, 2004.
 Ed. Jacques d'Adelswärd-Fersen. Dandy und Poet. Annäherungen. Hamburg: MännerschwarmSkript, 2005.
 Ed. Homosexualität in der DDR. Materialien und Meinungen. Hamburg: Männerschwarm, 2006.
 Ed. and afterword. Howard Sturgis: Tim. Roman. Hamburg: Männerschwarm, 2009.
 Ed. and afterword. Binet-Valmer: Lucien. Hamburg: Männerschwarm, 2009.
 Ed. and afterword. Adolf Wilbrandt: Fridolins heimliche Ehe. Hamburg: Männerschwarm, 2010.
 Ed. and cotransl. Jacques d'Adelswärd-Fersen: Lord Lyllian. Hamburg: Männerschwarm, 2010. 
 Ed. Fritz Geron Pernauhm (i.e., Guido Hermann Eckardt): Die Infamen. Hamburg: Männerschwarm, 2010.
 Ed. Peter Hamecher: Zwischen den Geschlechtern. Literaturkritik. Gedichte. Prosa. Hamburg: Männerschwarm, 2011.
 Ed. Jules Siber: Seelenwanderung. Hamburg: Männerschwarm, 2011.
 Coed., with Albert Knoll. Homunkulus: Zwischen den Geschlechtern. Roman einer geächteten Leidenschaft. Hamburg: Männerschwarm, 2012.
 Ed. Herman Bang: Michael. Hamburg: Männerschwarm, 2012.
 Ed. Emil Mario Vacano and Günther von Freiberg: König Phantasus. Roman eines Unglücklichen. Hamburg: Männerschwarm, 2014.
 Emil Mario Vacano. Eine biographische Skizze. Mit einem Textanhang. Hamburg: Männerschwarm, 2014.
 Oscar Wilde & Co. Historisch-literarische Spurensicherungen. Hamburg: Männerschwarm, 2016.
 Ed. Lukian: Erotes. Ein Gespräch über die Liebe. Trans. Hans Licht (i.e., Paul Brandt). Hamburg: Männerschwarm, 2017.
 Ed. and afterword. Luigi Settembrini: Die Neuplatoniker. Ein erotisches Märchen. Trans. Gerd Gauglitz. Hamburg: Männerschwarm, 2017. 
 Ed. and afterword. Karl Heinrich Ulrichs: Auf Bienchens Flügeln. Ein Flug um den Erdball in Epigrammen und poetischen Bildern. Nach dem Handexemplar des Autors. Hamburg: Männerschwarm, 2017.
 Afterword. Alec Scouffi: Hotel zum Goldfisch. Trans. Karl Blanck and Helene Schauer. Berlin: Männerschwarm, 2019.
 Afterword. Pierre Loti: Mein Bruder Yves. Trans. Robert Prölss. Berlin: Männerschwarm, 2020.
 Ed. and foreword. Edel-Uranier erzählen. Hans Waldau: Aus der Freundschaft sonnigsten Tagen. Der Liebling Kurt. Konradin: Ein Jünger Platos. Aus dem Leben eines Entgleisen. Theo von Tempesta: Aus dem Liebesleben zweier Freunde. Berlin: Männerschwarm, 2021.

English publication 

 Ed. and introduction (pp. vii-xxv). The Sins of the Cities of the Plain. Kansas City: Valancourt, 2013.

External links 
 Wolfram Setz in German National Library
 Wolfram Setz's rediscovery of K. H. Ulrichs (with photo)
 Setz's series "Bibliothek rosa Winkel" (in German, with photos)

References

1941 births
German LGBT rights activists
20th-century German historians
German male non-fiction writers
Living people
German gay writers
Historians of LGBT topics
LGBT historians
People from Stralsund
21st-century German historians